The Very Best of The Human League may refer to:

 The Very Best of The Human League (1998 album)
 The Very Best of The Human League (2003 album)
 The Very Best of The Human League (video)